Midway is an unincorporated community in Nevada County, Arkansas, United States.

References

Unincorporated communities in Nevada County, Arkansas
Unincorporated communities in Arkansas